Sir Thomas Green (c.1461 – 9 November 1506) was a member of the English gentry who died in the Tower of London, where he had been imprisoned for treason.  He is best known as the grandfather of Catherine Parr, last wife of King Henry VIII.

Family

Sir Thomas was the son of Sir Thomas Greene (d. 1462) and Matilda Throckmorton (d. 1496).

This branch of the Green family resided at Greens Norton in Northamptonshire from the fourteenth century until the death of the last Sir Thomas Green without male heirs in 1506.

Career
Little is known of Sir Thomas Green's life. A brass erected to the memory of his father in St Bartholomew's Church in Greens Norton records the latter as Sir Thomas Greene (d. 9 September 1462), the husband of Maud Throckmorton, a daughter of John Throckmorton (d. 12 April 1445), Under-Treasurer of England.  According to Fraser, his traits were those of any man of the time: he was conservative in religion, quarrelsome, conniving, and prone to taking the law into his own hands.

On 6 and 17 November 1505, inquisitions post mortem were taken concerning his lands in which the jurors found that he was 43 years of age at that date, and that his father, Sir Thomas Greene the elder, had died 9 September 1462 seised in fee of certain manors, and that his mother, Maud Greene, had 'entered and intruded into the premises and received all the issues thereof' from the date of his father's death until Michaelmas (29 September) 1482, 'immediately after which feast the said Thomas Grene, the son, entered and intruded without ever suing or obtaining licence from Edward IV or the present king or livery out of the king's hands, and has received the issues thereof ever since'.

He was sent to the Tower of London about that time on a trumped up charge of treason, and died there on 9 November 1506. The circumstances of the treason charge are set forth in Hardying's Chronicle:

Also shortly after the departing of [the earl] Philip, George Neville, Lord of Bergavenny, and Sir Thomas Grene, knight, were suspected to be guilty of the treason that Edmund Pole had wrought, and so cast in prison, but shortly after, when they had purged themselves of that suspicion and crime, they were delivered, albeit this knight, Sir Thomas Grene, died in prison.  The other lord, for his soberness of living & true heart that he bare to his prince, was had in greater estimation than ever he was before.

In connection with the treason charge, Green was mentioned in a deposition by an unnamed person who had been urged to enter Edmund de la Pole's service, but who had determined to consult with 'astronomers' as to what would be Pole's 'likely fortune' before doing so.

An inquisition post mortem taken on 13 March 1507 found that Green had died seised of the keepership of Whittlewood Forest and the manors of Norton Davy, Boughton, Little Brampton, Pysford, Great Houghton and Great Doddington, and 30 messuages, 600 acres of land, 300 acres of meadow, 1000 acres of pasture, £20 rent and 200 acres of wood in Norton Davy, Boughton, Little Brampton, Pysford, Great Houghton, Great Doddington, Sewell, Potcote, Higham Parva alias Cold Higham, and Middleton, and that his heirs were his two daughters, Anne Greene, aged 17 years and more, and Maud Green, aged 13 years and more.

The last of his line, he left two motherless daughters. As he had no male heirs, his estates passed to the Parr and Vaux families, into which his two daughters married.

Family
Greene married Jane, the daughter of Sir John Fogge, Knt. They had two daughters:

Anne Green (c.1489 - before 14 May 1523) who married Nicholas Vaux, 1st Baron Vaux of Harrowden (d. 14 May 1523) as his second wife. Vaux had previously been married to her sister's mother-in-law, Elizabeth FitzHugh. By Vaux, Anne was the mother of Thomas Vaux, 2nd Baron Vaux of Harrowden.
Maud Green (6 April 1492 – 1 December 1531), who married Sir Thomas Parr, son of Sir William Parr, and Elizabeth FitzHugh. They were parents of Queen Catherine Parr, Anne Herbert, Countess of Pembroke, and William Parr, 1st Marquess of Northampton.

Notes

References

External links
Maud Green (1492-1 December 1531), A Who’s Who of Tudor Women: G, compiled by Kathy Lynn Emerson to update and correct Wives and Daughters: The Women of Sixteenth-Century England (1984) Retrieved 27 September 2013
Thomas Grene (Green), knight: Northamptonshire, inquisition post mortem, 22 Henry VII (22 August 1506 – 21 August 1507), C 142/20/74, National Archives Retrieved 28
Greens Norton, Northamptonshire Retrieved 28 September 2013
Church of St Bartholomew, Greens Norton Retrieved 28 September 2013

1506 deaths
1461 births
16th-century English people
15th-century English people
People from West Northamptonshire District
English knights
Prisoners in the Tower of London